The Lladró Museum is the family home of the  Lladró brothers in Almàssera, a town close to Valencia, Spain, it has two permanent exhibits, the Historic Porcelain Museum and the Painting Collection.  The family home is a typical Valencian house with exhibits of earlier artistic works, a patio with a Moorish kiln where its first porcelains were fired and installations where children can learn activities.

Expositions 
The Lladró Museum consists of two permanent expositions, the Historic Porcelain Museum and the Painting Collection.

The Lladró Historic Porcelain Museum is formed by pieces retired from commercial catalogue, which have become museum exhibits because its artistic quality and historic significance, so that it is an excellent chance to see them.  The exposition covers more than 50 years, from the fifties (beginnings of the firm) to the nineties. 

The sculptures sum up the history of the brand, in a showing where the most characteristic pieces teach us different styles and materials employed in its realization.

The Lladró Pictorial Collection exhibits about 70 pieces which last from the late 14th century to the middle of the 20th century. Several rooms show gothic altarpieces, Renaissance panels, baroque oils and impressionist canvases, but the most important works pertain to Spanish Baroque period and the most outstanding Valencian painters.

The Museum shows paintings by noteworthy masters like Rubens, El Greco, Vicente Macip, Juan de Juanes, Juan Ribalta, Sánchez Cotán, Valdés Leal, Francisco de Zurbarán, Vicente López, Ignacio Pinazo, Jusepe de Ribera lo Spagnoletto or Joaquín Sorolla.

External links
 Lladró Museum - official site

Art museums and galleries in Spain
Ceramics museums
Decorative arts museums in Spain
Museums in Valencia
Tourist attractions in Valencia